Selidosema is a genus of moths in the family Geometridae first described by Jacob Hübner in 1823.

Species
Selidosema agoraea Meyrick, 1892
Selidosema ambustaria (Geyer, 1831)
Selidosema brunnearia (Villers, 1889)
Selidosema erebaria Oberthür, 1883 (formerly in Menophra or Peribatodes)
Selidosema modestarium (Püngeler, 1914)
Selidosema parenzani Hausmann, 1993
Selidosema plumaria (Denis & Schiffermüller, 1775)
Selidosema taeniolaria (Hübner, 1813)

References

Boarmiini